Crispin Olando (born 3 January 1988) is a Kenyan international footballer who plays professionally as a midfielder.

Club career 

Olando has played his entire career in the Kenyan Premier League, starting with Thika United FC in 2006 before moving to Tusker FC in 2010.

International career 

Olando was a member of the Kenya national under-20 football team.

Olando was first called up to the Kenya national football team in September 2011 for qualifying matches for the 2012 Africa Cup of Nations. He scored in a warm-up friendly against high school side Kakamega School boys, then made his competitive debut against Uganda on October 8, 2011, coming on the in 88th minute.

Honours 

Olando was team captain of Thika United in 2008. He was nominated for the Kenyan Premier League Footballer of the Year Awards for 2009 for Best Midfielder, and nominated for the same award in 2010. Olando won the Kenyan Premier League title with Tusker FC in 2011.

References

Kenyan footballers
Living people
1988 births
Association football midfielders
Kenya international footballers